Desvages is a surname. Notable people with the surname include:

André Desvages (1944–2018), French professional road bicycle racer
Pierre Desvages (1867–?), French cyclist